Louis Heathcote (born 3 July 1997) is an English professional snooker player.

Career
In May 2019, Heathcote came through Q-School - Event 2 by winning six matches to earn a two-year card on the World Snooker Tour for the 2019–20 and 2020–21 seasons.

Performance and rankings timeline

Career finals

Amateur finals: 1

References

External links
Louis Heathcote at Snooker.org
Louis Heathcote at worldsnooker.com

English snooker players
Living people
1997 births
Sportspeople from Leicester